Gardna Wielka is a non-operational PKP railway station in Gardna Wielka (Pomeranian Voivodeship), Poland.

Lines crossing the station

References
 Gardna Wielka article at Polish Stations Database , URL accessed on 21 March 2006

Railway stations in Pomeranian Voivodeship
Disused railway stations in Pomeranian Voivodeship
Słupsk County